Justice John Adrian St. Valentine W. Jayewardene (1877–1927) was a Ceylonese (Sri Lankan) judge and lawyer. He was a Judge of the Supreme Court of Ceylon.

Born to James Alfred Jayewardene, a Proctor who was the Deputy Coroner of Colombo. His brothers included Hector Alfred Jayewardene who was an advocate and member of the Colombo Municipal Council, Colonel Theodore Godfrey Wijesinghe Jayewardene was a Member of the State Council for Balangoda electorate and Eugene Wilfred Jayewardene who also became a Judge of the Supreme Court.

Wilfred Jayewardene was educated at the Royal College, Colombo, and was called to the bar at the Inner Temple, becoming a barrister. In 1901 he returned to Ceylon and began his practice as an advocate. From 1922 to 1924 he served as the District Judge of Colombo and in 1923 was appointed acting Puisne Justice thereafter confirmed as Judge of the Supreme Court of Ceylon.

In 1906, Jayewardene married Ethel Charlotte Irene, daughter of Mudaliyar Francis William Tillekeratne Dissanayake. His daughter Clodagh Jayasuriya, was elected to parliament and nephew J R Jayewardene became the first executive President of Sri Lanka.

See also 
List of political families in Sri Lanka

References

External links
 The JAYEWARDENE Ancestry

1877 births
1927 deaths
Puisne Justices of the Supreme Court of Ceylon
Sinhalese lawyers
Alumni of Royal College, Colombo
Members of the Inner Temple
British Ceylon judges
District Courts of Sri Lanka judges
Sinhalese judges
John Adrian